William Henry Tuckwell Isaacs (4 March 1884 – 6 May 1955) was a British cyclist. He won a bronze medal in the men's 2000 metres tandem event, with Charlie Brooks, at the 1908 Summer Olympics.

References

External links
 

1884 births
1955 deaths
British male cyclists
Olympic cyclists of Great Britain
Cyclists at the 1908 Summer Olympics
Olympic bronze medallists for Great Britain
Olympic medalists in cycling
People from Fulham
Cyclists from Greater London
Medalists at the 1908 Summer Olympics
21st-century British people